Jeffry Fortes (born 22 March 1989) is a professional footballer who plays as a defensive midfielder for De Graafschap. Born in the Netherlands, he represents the Cape Verde national football team.

Club career
On 12 August 2021, he moved to De Graafschap on a one-year contract.

International career
Fortes was born in the Netherlands to parents of Cape Verdean descent. He made his debut for the Cape Verde national football team in a 1–0 win over Mozambique.
He was named in the roster for the 2021 Africa cup of nations  when the team reached the round of 16..

References

External links
 
 Voetbal International profile 

Living people
1989 births
Association football fullbacks
Cape Verdean footballers
Cape Verde international footballers
Dutch footballers
Dutch sportspeople of Cape Verdean descent
FC Dordrecht players
FC Den Bosch players
Excelsior Rotterdam players
Sparta Rotterdam players
De Graafschap players
Eredivisie players
Eerste Divisie players
Footballers from Rotterdam
2015 Africa Cup of Nations players
2021 Africa Cup of Nations players